Spring Creek Township is a township in Greenwood County, Kansas, USA.  As of the 2000 census, its population was 154.

Geography
According to the USGS, it contains one cemetery, Reece.

The streams of Burnt Creek and Silver Creek run through this township.

References
 USGS Geographic Names Information System (GNIS)

External links
 US-Counties.com
 City-Data.com

Townships in Greenwood County, Kansas
Townships in Kansas